Soveline Beaubrun (born 7 December 1997) is a Haitian footballer who plays as a centre back for AS Tigresses and the Haiti women's national team.

International goals
Scores and results list Haiti's goal tally first

References

External links 
 

1997 births
Living people
Women's association football central defenders
Haitian women's footballers
People from Artibonite (department)
Haiti women's international footballers